Scott Leslie Schwartz (born March 16, 1959), also known as The Ultimate Bad Guy, is an American film and television actor and stuntman, and former professional wrestler.  His size and agility at 6'8" and  have allowed him many roles as thug or villain for film and television.

Background 

Schwartz was born in the United States. He is of Israeli descent and is a devout Jew. Schwartz was born and raised in Philadelphia, where he played football, baseball and ice hockey at Washington High School before attending Temple University. After college, he became a professional wrestler, wrestling under the ring-names of "Joshua Ben-Gurion—The Israeli Commando" and "Giant David". Schwartz toured as a wrestler and held many titles, before turning his career toward performance in film and television.

Apart from his acting, and after completing training, Schwartz became a Los Angeles County Sheriff's Deputy and a reserve deputy with the Los Angeles County Sheriff's Department. He currently resides in Seal Beach, California.

Professional wrestling career 
After college, Schwartz became a professional wrestler, trained in the late '70s by wrestling's Walter "Killer" Kowalski. Schwartz's original ring-name was Giant David, but by the '80s he was known as Joshua Ben-Gurion—The Israeli Commando and Igor the Giant. As a professional wrestler, he performed in Japan, South Africa, Australia, New Zealand, American Samoa, Western Samoa, Fiji, Tonga, Guam, Canada and 40 of the 50 United States. He was promoted by Verne Gagne, Vince McMahon, Herb Abrams, Antone "Ripper" Leone, and Bruno Sammartino.

Film career
Schwartz was wrestling on tour in Bakersfield, California, when he was approached by a Hollywood agent. After seeing Schwartz's wrestling on television, the agent had traveled to Bakerfield to meet him, feeling Schwartz should take his skills into performing arts. At first, Schwartz was reluctant to change careers, wanting to retire as a wrestler.

In his early stunt work, and because of his background in pro wrestling, Schwartz was able to handle the staged combat, which required protecting opponents from harm. Due to his look, size, agility, and ability to handle dialogue, he has been able to obtain roles as the "bad guy" in many films and television projects. He is known for his work in such films and TV shows as Buffy the Vampire Slayer, Angel, Star Trek: Enterprise, The Scorpion King, Charmed, The Tick, and Black Scorpion among others, but he is probably most recognized for his role as 'Bruiser' in the films Ocean's Eleven, Ocean's Twelve and Ocean's Thirteen. He has appeared in such big budget films as Spider-Man, Fire Down Below, Starsky & Hutch, and Fun with Dick and Jane.

Championships and accomplishments
Universal Wrestling Federation
UWF Israeli Championship (1 time)

Filmography
As actor

 UWF Fury Hour (1990, TV Series)
 Shock 'Em Dead (1991) as Guard
 For Parents Only (1991) as The Wrench
 Terminal USA (1993) as Big Tony
 Back in Action (1993) as Kasajian's Thug (uncredited)
 Dangerous Waters (1994) as Carlito
 Silent Fury (1994) as Crusher
 Savate (1995) as Bruno the Horrible
 The Set-Up (1995) as Maniac (uncredited)
 Tiger Mask (1996) as Sonic Boom
 Meet Wally Sparks (1997) as American Wrestler #2
 Fire Down Below (1997) as Pimple
 Dilemma (1997) as Guard #1
 High Voltage (1997) as Biker
 The Misadventures of James Spawn (1998) as Drill Sergeant
 Centurion Force (1998) as Nicky
 P.U.N.K.S. (1999) as Convict
 Martial Law (1999, TV Series) as Boris (uncredited)
 Bridge of Dragons (1999) as Belmont
 Final Voyage (1999) as Russ
 V.I.P. (1999, TV Series) as Mo Big
 The Flintstones in Viva Rock Vegas (2000) as Caveman Boxer (uncredited)
 Agent Red (2000) as Bald henchman (uncredited)
 Just Sue Me (2000) as The Chauffeur
 The Black Rose (2000) as Armand
 Nash Bridges (2001, TV Series) as Pierre LaFoote
 Carman: The Champion (2001) as Big Mike
 Southlander: Diary of a Desperate Musician (2001) as Chef
  (2000) as Bear
 Tomcats (2001) as Biker (uncredited)
 The One (2001) as Prisoner (uncredited)
 Ocean's Eleven (2001) as Bulldog, the Bruiser
 The Tick (2002, TV Series) as Rex
 The Scorpion King (2002) as Torturer
 Spider-Man (2002) as Screaming Wrestler (uncredited)
 Lost Treasure (2003) as Crazy Joe
 Starsky and Hutch (2004) as Fat Ron
 Terminal Island (2004) as Frank
 Max Havoc: Curse of the Dragon (2004) as Biker Bar Tough
 Ocean's Twelve (2004) as Bruiser
 Daydream Believer (2005, Short) as Schulte
 Fun with Dick and Jane (2005) as Bigger Convenience Store Clerk
 Blood Ranch (2006)
 Mind of Mencia (TV, TV Series) as Turk
 Cain and Abel (2006) as Yuri
 Vagabond (2006) as Carnivore
 Smoked (2006, Short) as Schulte
 Epic Movie (2007) as Rubeus Hagrid (uncredited)
 ELI (2007, Short) as Graves
 Ocean's Thirteen (2007) as Bruiser
 What We Do Is Secret (2007) as Biker (uncredited)
 Placebo (2008) as Ed
 The Young and the Restless (2009, TV Series) as Amos Slaughter
 Ctrl (2009, TV Series) as Security Guard
 Lost in the Woods (2009) as Kurt
 Wrong Side of Town (2010) as Deacon
 Listen to Your Heart (2010) as Greg
 Daddy's Home (2010) as Deputy Cruz
 The Sinners (2010) as Officer Rains
 Journey to Promethea (2010, TV Movie) as Kronin
 For Christ's Sake (2010) as Gordy
 Changing Hands (2010) as Sergeant Mike Smith
 Changing Hands Feature (2012)
 Inventing Adam (2013) as Morty
 Betrayal (2013) as Misha
 Xtinction: Predator X (2014) as Larry Boudreaux
 Better Criminal (2016) as Danny
 Holding St. Peter's Conquest [Us] (2017) as Polonski
 Garlic & Gunpowder (2017) as Shop Owner

As stuntman
 Dilemma (1997)
 My Giant (1998)
 The Adventures of Rocky & Bullwinkle (2000)
 Agent Red (2000) (stunts)
 Gedo (2001)
 Crazy as Hell (2002)
 Epic Movie (2007)
 Weeds (2007) (TV)

References

External links
Official website

 

Living people
American male actors
American male professional wrestlers
Faux Russian professional wrestlers 
American people of Israeli descent
Jewish American male actors
Jewish professional wrestlers
1959 births
21st-century American Jews